Murchadh Ó Madadhan (died 1327) was King of Síol Anmchadha.

Murchad of Magh Bealaigh, who was Chief from 1286 to 1327. Murchad married Marcella, daughter of Eoghan Ó Cellaigh. In 1327 He resigned his chieftainship of his own accord and went away from Royal Rule to Rome, to resign his soul to the Supreme King, and his body to the cemetery of Saint Peter in the chief city.

References

 http://www.rootsweb.ancestry.com/~irlkik/ihm/uimaine.htm
 Annals of Ulster at CELT: Corpus of Electronic Texts at University College Cork
 Annals of Tigernach at CELT: Corpus of Electronic Texts at University College Cork
 Revised edition of McCarthy's synchronisms at Trinity College Dublin.
 Irish Kings and High-Kings, Francis John Byrne, Dublin (1971;2003) Four Courts Press, 
 History of the O'Maddens of Hy-Many, Gerard Madden, 2004. .
 The Life, Legends and Legacy of Saint Kerrill: A Fifth-Century East Galway Evangelist by Joseph Mannion, 2004. 
 http://www.ucc.ie/celt/published/G105007/index.html

People from County Galway
Medieval Gaels from Ireland
Irish lords
14th-century Irish monarchs
1327 deaths
Year of birth unknown